FC Echallens is a Swiss football club from Echallens, canton Vaud. The team currently plays in Liga 1., fourth highest tier in the Swiss football pyramid. The club was formed in 1921.

Stadium
FC Echallens play their home games at Sportplatz 3 Sapins in Echallens. The capacity is 3000 and is the opposite of the modern all seater stadiums in that it is standing-room only.

Current squad
As of 1 November 2021.

Notable former players

External links
Official Website 
Soccerway.com profile 
Football.ch profile 

Football clubs in Switzerland
Association football clubs established in 1921
1921 establishments in Switzerland